North Queensland Stadium, commercially known as Queensland Country Bank Stadium, is a multi-purpose stadium in South Townsville, Queensland, Australia, primarily used for rugby league.

History
As part of Australia's 2022 FIFA World Cup bid in 2010, an analysis of Townsville's existing Willows Sports Complex suggested a total redevelopment of the site and outlined key issues including the growth rate of the surrounding suburbs and incompatibility of hosting major events in an expanding residential centre, with limited public transport access. In August 2011, the Bligh Government released a concept design for a new inner-city $185 million sporting stadium in South Townsville. The concept plan identified a 17.28 hectare parcel of land bounded by Saunders St and owned by QR National, as the ideal site for a new international standard stadium. The 30,000-seat stadium would include 100 open-air corporate boxes and 25 enclosed corporate suites. North Queensland Cowboys chairman Laurence Lancini supported the concept and said relocating the Cowboys' home ground to the inner-city site would not only benefit the club, but the city as a whole. Two months prior to the concept release, then-Queensland Premier Anna Bligh had declared Townsville the capital of north Queensland and had outlined the importance of sporting events and entertainment in the Townsville Futures Plan. The following year saw Bligh and the Queensland Labor Party lose the 2012 Queensland state election which resulted in the Queensland Liberal National Party not adopting the Townsville Futures Plan.

The concept of a new Townsville stadium was again put on the agenda in the lead up to the 2015 Queensland state election. In December 2014, Queensland Opposition Leader Annastacia Palaszczuk promised the Queensland Labor Party would provide $100 million in funding for a new stadium in Townsville's central business district, should they win the election. In January 2015 then-premier Campbell Newman announced $150 million in funding for the same project that would be funded through the sale of state assets.

In April 2015, the Townsville City Council purchased the 17.28ha site in South Townsville with the hope that funding could be secured for the project in the near future. A visit from then-Prime Minister Tony Abbott a month later raised hopes as it was revealed that the federal Liberal National Party was investigating options for Commonwealth funding towards the stadium. Just three days later Treasurer Joe Hockey ruled out Commonwealth funding for the project.

The campaign to build a new stadium in Townsville received national exposure in October 2015 when the North Queensland Cowboys secured their first National Rugby League premiership. With millions watching on a national broadcast and Prime Minister Malcolm Turnbull standing on the same stage, Cowboys captain Johnathan Thurston expressed his belief that north Queensland deserved a new stadium. Following Thurston's speech, the campaign received an immense amount of media coverage. Three days after the Cowboys' 2015 NRL Grand Final win, it was revealed that club officials would travel to Canberra later that month to lobby for federal funding. On 3 November 2015 Bill Shorten and the federal Labor party promised $100 million towards funding the project.

On 10 June 2016 Premier Annastacia Palaszczuk committed an extra $40 million towards the project which upped the total state contribution to $140 million. Three days later Prime Minister Malcolm Turnbull matched the federal Labor party's pledge of $100 million, essentially ensuring the project becomes a reality regardless of which major party won the 2016 federal election.

On 14 June 2019, the North Queensland Stadium website was officially launched alongside the announcement that international musician Sir Elton John would bring his final world tour, Farewell Yellow Brick Road, on 29 February 2020 as the first official act for the stadium.

The first NRL premiership match to be held at the ground was between Queensland rivals the North Queensland Cowboys and Brisbane Broncos in round one of the 2020 NRL season. Jake Turpin scored the stadium's first try, Jamayne Isaako scored the first goal and Michael Morgan slotted the first field goal as the Broncos won 28–21.

Game One of the 2021 State of Origin series was played in Townsville on 9 June 2021. The match was originally scheduled to be played at the Melbourne Cricket Ground but was moved to Townsville due to another COVID-19 outbreak in Melbourne. In front of a stadium record crowd 27,533 made possible thanks to temporary stands being erected at the northern end of the ground increasing the stadium's capacity to 28,000 for the game, New South Wales won 50–6 against Queensland, with the game being the first time since 2000 (and second in the game's history) that the New South Wales side scored above the half-century. It is currently the game with the second highest margin of 44.

On September 11, 2021, the ground hosted its first NRL finals matches when due to a COVID-19 outbreak in Sydney, two finals matches were moved to the stadium with the Sydney Roosters taking on the Gold Coast Titans in the first match, followed by the Penrith Panthers taking on South Sydney, in front of 18,244 spectators.

The stadium is scheduled to host in April 2022 its inaugural soccer match, being an international football match between Australia and New Zealand, which is expected to draw around 16,000 spectators and $2 million.

Construction
Construction of the stadium, carried out by BESIX Watpac, began on 18 August 2017, and was completed in February 2020.

BESIX Watpac set out with an Indigenous participation goal of 6.6%. This figure almost doubled to 11.9%, equating to more than 122,065 hours undertaken by the Aboriginal workforce.

The project won three awards at the 2020 Master Builders Queensland construction awards for North Queensland: Project of the Year award, Best Sporting Facilities award and Excellence in Workplace Health & Safety.

Name
In 2014 a funding proposal was released that suggested the stadium should officially be known as Stadium Northern Australia. Plans released in December 2016 revealed the stadium would be known as North Queensland Stadium.

In June 2019, expressions of interest were sought for naming rights to the stadium.

On 12 December 2019, Queensland Country Credit Union were announced as official naming rights sponsor of the stadium, with the venue to be commercially known as Queensland Country Bank Stadium.

Transport
A new pedestrian bridge over Ross Creek from Blackwood Street is the planned connection between the Townsville CBD and the stadium. A pedestrian bridge over Ross Creek already exists 200 metres south of the project site on Fletcher Street. The Townsville Railway Station is located approximately 300 metres from the Fletcher Street pedestrian bridge and 500 metres from the stadium site.
The new Reid Park bridge was constructed over the rail line simultaneously with the construction of the stadium to facilitate pedestrian movement. The project was praised by Member for Townsville Scott Stewart as being "crucial to ensure the efficient operation of North Queensland Stadium." The bridge was completed on time despite several setbacks.
Several bus stops also surround the stadium site, with a new main city bus terminal about to start construction on Ogden Street within walking distance of the new stadium.

Sports

Association Football
On 4 March 2020 it was announced that A-League side Brisbane Roar would play against Premier League club Crystal Palace on 11 July 2020. This was however indefinitely postponed due to the COVID-19 pandemic. In April 2022, it was announced that Brisbane Roar would play a friendly against Premier League club Aston Villa, which took place on 20 July 2022 with the English club winning 1–0.

Rugby Union
In August 2021 it was announced that on Saturday 25 September, the Springboks and All Blacks would play their historic 100th test at North Queensland Stadium. The game, won by New Zealand formed part of a double header at the stadium with Australia also playing against Argentina. These games were part of the 2021 Rugby Championship.

Boxing
The stadium hosted Tim Tszyu's Super Welterweight bout with Jeff Horn for the IBF Australasian Super Welter & WBO Global Super Welter titles on August 26, 2020.

Tszyu won the fight by TKO after Horn failed to return from his corner to start the 9th round.

Concerts

Accessibility

Statues

References 

Boxing venues in Australia
Rugby league stadiums in Australia
Sports venues in Townsville
Music venues in Australia
Venues of the 2032 Summer Olympics and Paralympics